Elisa Frisoni (born 8 August 1985) is an Italian female  track cyclist, and part of the national team. She competed at the 2004, 2005, 2006, 2008, 2009 and 2010 UCI Track Cycling World Championships. She won the silver medal in the keirin event at the 2004 UCI Track Cycling World Championships and 2005 UCI Track Cycling World Championships.

References

External links
 
 
 
 
 

1985 births
Living people
Italian track cyclists
Italian female cyclists
Place of birth missing (living people)
Cyclists from the Province of Verona
21st-century Italian women